Pratt Contractors Ltd v Transit New Zealand [2005] 2 NZLR 433 is a decision of the Judicial Committee of the Privy Council on appeal from the Court of Appeal of New Zealand regarding sale of property by tender.

References

Judicial Committee of the Privy Council cases on appeal from New Zealand
New Zealand contract case law
2003 in New Zealand law
2003 in case law